Events from the year 2020 in Pakistan.

Incumbents

National government

Provincial governments

Events

January
January 1 – February 28 – Bangladeshi cricket team in Pakistan in 2019–20.
January 10
January 2020 Quetta bombing.
January 2020 lunar eclipse

February
 February 1 – The government declared a national emergency to protect crops and help farmers.
 February 9 – 16 – 2020 Kabaddi World Cup (Circle style).
 February 12 – Hafiz Saeed was convicted of two counts of terrorist financing and was sentenced to five-and-a-half years in prison.
 February 17 – February 2020 Quetta bombing.
 February 20 – 2020 Pakistan Super League: Final.
 February 26 – The first two cases of COVID-19 are reported in Pakistan.
 February 28 – Press reports state that China may send flocks of ducks to Pakistan to fight locusts.

March
 March 10 – 2020 Tablighi Jamaat COVID-19 hotspot in Pakistan

May
 May 21 – Islamabad High Court ordered that the elephant Kaavan should be immediately relocated to a different sanctuary following a four-year campaign by popular pop singer Cher since 2016 demanding for the release of Kaavan from Islamabad Zoo.
 May 22 – Pakistan International Airlines Flight 8303 crashed in Karachi, Sindh, killing 97 of the 99 people on board as well as one on the ground.

June
 June 6 – Govt appoints Muhammad Sadiq as country's first special representative for Afghanistan.
 June 19 – The Supreme Court of Pakistan has quashed a presidential reference filed against Justice Qazi Faiz Esa.
 June 29 – Pakistan Stock Exchange attack - A mass shooting in Karachi left at least 8 people dead including 4 perpetrators.
 June 30 – Nigar Johar becomes the Pakistan Army's first female lieutenant general.

July
 July 1 – Pakistan temporarily bans popular online game PUBG.
 July 3 – US donates 100 ventilators to support Pakistan's COVID-19 response.
 July 6 – PM Imran Khan inaugurates country's first ever indigenously made ventilators at National Radio and Telecommunication Corporation (NRTC) in Haripur.
 July 11 – Pakistan-born scientist Asifa Akhtar has become the first international female vice president of the biology and medicine section at Germany's prestigious Max Planck Society.
8 July 23 – Pakistan at the 2020 Summer Olympics
 July 29 – In terrorist attack, a soldier is killed at Bajaur security post.

August
 August 5 – At least 39 people were injured in an RGD-1 grenade attack on a Jamaat-i-Islami rally in the Gulshan-e-Iqbal neighborhood of Karachi. The Sindhudesh Revolutionary Army claimed responsibility for the attack.
 August 10 – A bomb killed at least 5 people and several others were injured in Chaman, Balochistan.
 August 13 - Killing of Hayat Baloch
 August 24 - Pakistan at the 2020 Summer Paralympics
 August 25 - 2020 Karachi floods

September
 September 7 – Mohmand Marble Mine Incident - A mine disaster left at least 19 people dead and another 20 were injured.
 September 10 – PM Pakistan Launches "Roshan Digital Account" For Overseas Pakistanis.

October
 October 9 - Pakistan banned short video-sharing application TikTok because of immoral videos.
 October 16
 An attack kills least 7 soldiers and 7 security guards in Balochistan.
 A bomb kills at least 6 members of the Army in North Waziristan.
 October 20 - Pakistan after 10 days hiatus, Pakistan banned TikTok.
 October 21 - At least 5 people were killed and 27 others were injured in an explosion at an apartment building in Karachi.
 October 27 - 2020 Peshawar school bombing - Eight students were killed in a bombing at a school in Peshawar, Khyber Pakhtunkhwa.
28 October- Federal Board of Revenue (FBR) sealed cellular Sim company Jazz head office after they did not pay 25 billions rupees in 2018.

November
 15 November
2020 Gilgit-Baltistan Assembly election

December
 2020 Karak temple attack

Arts

Cinema

Economy 
 2019–20 Pakistan federal budget
 2020–21 Pakistan federal budget

Deaths

January
January 7 – Fakhruddin G. Ebrahim, judge and former Chief Election Commissioner (b. 1928).
January 19 – Ali Mardan Shah, politician (b. 1957).
January 28 – Mohammad Munaf, cricketer (b. 1935).

February
February 5 – Mohammad Shafiq, politician.
February 6 – Malik Ata Muhammad Khan, feudal lord and politician (b. 1941).
February 10 – Waqar Hasan, cricketer (b. 1932).
February 15
Shahnaz Ansari, politician (b. 1970).
Naeemul Haque, political advisor (b. 1949).
February 20 – Usman Ullah Khan, Olympic boxer (b. 1974).
February 21 – Lal Khan, Marxist political theorist (b. 1956).
February 25 – Naimatullah Khan, politician (b. 1930).

March
March 6 – Amanullah, actor (b. 1950).
March 14 – Mubashir Hassan, politician (b. 1922).

May
May 22 – Zara Abid

June
June 26 – Munawar Hasan, former Ameer Jamat E Islami (b. 1941).
June 22 – Allama Talib Jauhari, Islamic scholar (b. 1939).
June 20 – Mufti Muhammad Naeem, cleric (b.1958).
June 17 – Tariq Aziz, television host (b. 1936)
June 13 – Sabiha Khanum, actress (b. 1935).

July

August
20 August - Mir Hasil Khan Bizenjo (born 1958), veteran politician and National party president
26 August- Muzaffar Hussain Shah (born 1945), former Chief Minister of Sindh
29 August - Shafaullah rokhri (born 1966), Pakistani  folk singer and songwriter, music producer

September
13 September Zameer Akhter Naqvi (Islamic Scholar) died

November

 2 November - Hafiz Muhammad Durrab Zafar a young talented Boy from Sahiwal
 13 November 2020 Justice Waqar Ahmed Seth Judge of Supreme Court of Pakistan who Sentenced Death to Ex President of Pakistan General Musharraf.
 20 November - Allama Khadim Hussain Rizvi (born 1966) Political party (Tahreek-e-labbaik Pakistan) millions of people attend the funeral of Allama Khadim Hussain Rizvi. (TJK) https://www.dawn.com/news/1591262
 25 November 2020 Muhammad Jadam Mangrio Politician Belongs to Pakistan Muslim League Functional

December
2 December – Mir Zafarullah Khan Jamali, 15th Prime Minister of Pakistan.
4 December – Arshad Malik, Judge.
5 December – Suhail Zaheer Lari, historian, author.
16 December – Firdous Begum
31 December – Total 10105+ Persons were died due to COVID-19 during February to 31 December 2020.

See also

Country overviews
 Pakistan
 History of Pakistan
 History of modern Pakistan
 Outline of Pakistan
 Government of Pakistan
 Politics of Pakistan
 Years in Pakistan

Related timelines for current period
 2020
 2020 in politics and government
 2020s
 21st century

References

 
Pakistan
Years of the 21st century in Pakistan
2020s in Pakistan
Pakistan